Ian Crampton Baker (23 May 1923 – 11 May 2010) was a British architect, best known for Rutherford School, Paddington, and the National Motor Museum, Beaulieu, both of which he co-designed with Leonard Manasseh. He was born in Westcliffe-on-Sea and was educated at Mill Hill School, Aberystwyth University, and Architectural Association School of Architecture.

References

1923 births
2010 deaths
20th-century English architects
People from Westcliff-on-Sea
People educated at Mill Hill School
Architects from Essex
Alumni of Aberystwyth University
Alumni of the Architectural Association School of Architecture